Saharsa is one of the thirty-eight districts of Bihar, India. Saharsa city is the administrative headquarters of this district. Saharsa district is a part of the Kosi Division and it became a district on 1 April 1954 and has subsequently become smaller with other districts being carved from it, most notably Madhepura in 1981.

Saharsa is located in the Mithila region, one of the earliest centers of Brahminical civilization in India. Saharsa is considered as the heart of whole Mithila region. it is the place which gave birth to legends such as like Mandana Misra, Laxminath Gosain, Ubhai Bharti, etc. The region of Bangaon and Mahisi is known for producing a large number of civil servants.

History
Saharsa is part of the Mithila region. Mithila first gained prominence after being settled by Indo-Aryan peoples who established the Mithila Kingdom (also called Kingdom of the Videhas).
During the late Vedic period (c. 1100–500 BCE), Videha became one of the major political and cultural centers of South Asia, along with Kuru and Pañcāla. The kings of the Videha Kingdom were called Janakas. The Videha Kingdom was later incorporated into the Vajjika League, which had its capital in the city of Vaishali, which is also in Mithila.

Mandan Mishra whose conversation with the Shankaracharya was considered one of the most intellectual conversations in the world was done in Mahismati village, nowadays Mahisi village. During the Dharma Vijaya yatra of Adi Shankara, He visited Mahisi village (then called Mahishmati) to debate Mandana Misra. After winning in all discussions in all over the nation, He lost the Sastrartha there.

Earlier, the Saharsa district was part of the Munger and Bhagalpur districts. On 1 April 1954 it was made a district of its own. It was also made headquarters of Kosi division on 2 October 1972, comprising Saharsa, Purnia and Katihar district, with its headquarters at Saharsa. Similarly a new Civil Sub-Division Birpur was created on 1 December 1972, consisting of 24 development blocks, including Raghopur, Chhatapur, Basantpur and Nirmali, which were previously under Supaul subdivision of the district. Two new districts, Madhepura and Supaul, were formed from Saharsa district on 30 April 1981 and 1991. Saharsa district now consists of two subdivisions, Saharsa Sadar and Simri Bakhtiarpur. The district consists of 10 development blocks and anchals each.

Geography 

Saharsa district is surrounded on the west by the river Kosi, which has an abundance of fish and Makhana. Saharsa is famous for its varieties of mangoes and litchis.

Saharsa district comprises the following Sub-Divisions: Saharasa Sadar and Simri Bakhtiyarpur.

Politics 
  

|}

Administration 
Saharsa consists of 10 blocks arranged in two subdivisions:

Saharsa Sadar subidivision 
 Nauhatta
 Sattar Kataiya
 Mahishi
 Kahara
 Sour Bazar
 Patarghat
 Sonbarsa

Simri-Bakhtiyarpur subdivision 

 Simri-Bakhtiyarpur
 Salkhua
 Banma Itahri

Economy
It is the major producer of best quality of Corn and Makhana in India. From Saharsa corn and Makhana are exported abroad country such as America, France, Japan, England. Every year 2 lakhs tonnes of corn are exported to different country and similarly Makhana also. The follgrown in the region; Makhana (Euryale ferox Salisb), rice, mangoes, litchi, bamboo, mustard, corn, wheat, ber and sugarcane. Sagwan or 'Tectona grandis'') trees are now grown on a large scale.

Demographics

According to the 2011 census Saharsa district has a population of 1,900,661, This gives it a ranking of 247th in India (out of a total of 640). Its population growth rate over the decade 2001–2011 was 25.79%. Saharsa has a sex ratio of 906 females for every 1000 males, and a literacy rate of 54.57%. 8.24% of the population lives in urban areas. Scheduled Castes make up 16.69% and 0.32% of the population respectively.

At the time of the 2011 Census of India, 68.87% of the population in the district spoke Maithili, 21.15% Hindi and 9.62% Urdu as their first language.

Notable people 

 A. A. Khan - Physicist
 Anand Singh - Gangster and politician
 Abdul Ghafoor - Politician and former minister
 Baldev Mishra - Maithili writer
 Dinesh Chandra Yadav - Politician and former MP
 Jamshedpur Gopeshwar - Trade union leader and politician
 Laxminath Gosain - Yogi and Poet
 Mandana Mishra - Advaita scholar
 Ulka Gupta - TV Serial actress

See also 
List of villages of Saharsa

References

External links 
 Saharsa Information Portal
 Official website of Saharsa
 http://saharsa.in
 Saharsa news

 
Districts of Bihar